The Toyota Corolla E80 is a range of small automobiles manufactured and marketed by Toyota from 1983 to 1987 as the fifth generation of cars under the Corolla and Toyota Sprinter nameplates, with production totaling approximately 3.3 million, and most models adopting a front-wheel drive layout.

The AE85 and AE86 Corolla Levin and Sprinter Trueno (SR-5/GT-S in US) retained rear-wheel drive from the previous E70 generation, along with the three-door "liftback" (E72), three-door van (E70) and five-door wagon (E70) of the previous generation, which remained in production. The AE86 ultimately gained international prominence in the motorsport of drifting and wide popularity in Showroom Stock, Group A, and Group N, Rally and Club racing.

In a joint venture with General Motors, mildly restyled versions of the front-wheel drive AE82 sedan and liftback were locally manufactured and sold in the United States as the Chevrolet Nova.

Design
The front-wheel-drive wheelbase was now .

It was the first Corolla to top the New Zealand top-ten lists, ending Ford's dominance of that market. A shorter hatchback range, called the Corolla FX in Japan and the Corolla Compact in Germany, arrived in October 1984 on the front-wheel-drive platform. The three- and five-door hatchbacks resembled the Corolla sedan with a truncated rear deck and trunk. Although there was a five-door liftback model of the basic Corolla, the shorter FX hatchback was sold alongside it. The Corolla FX replaced the Toyota Starlet in North America.

A DOHC 16-valve engine, designated 4A-GE, was added in 1983 on the rear-drive cars. It was a 1.6 L (1,587 cc) inline-four and produced , turning the Levin/Trueno (Japan), Corolla GT coupé (Europe) and Corolla GT-S (North America) into a what was arguably a sports car. The three-door FWD hatchback was also available with this engine; it was known as the Corolla FX-GT in Japan and Corolla FX-16 in North America. This engine was also combined with the front-drive transaxle to power the mid-engined Toyota MR2.

The Sprinter sports cars, in two-door coupé and three-door liftback forms, were notable for being the line's first use of pop-up headlamps, which the equivalent Corolla Levin sports models did not have.

Launched in Japan in May 1983, it reached Europe (including the right-hand drive UK market) three months later, and sold well in most European markets. The car was facelifted in May 1985, receiving larger headlights akin to those installed on the coupés. The smaller 1.3-litre A-series engine was replaced by the new 12-valve 2E unit at the same time for most markets.

Japan
The 1.3-litre 2A engine was replaced by the more modern 12-valve 2E engine along with a May 1985 facelift at Toyota Corolla Store locations. The range began with the 1300 Custom DX and ended with the 1600 GT Limited, introduced in June 1986. The FX hatchback lineup was considered a semi-separate line and received a different nose and different equipment levels than its sedan and liftback counterparts. The 1.3 was not available in the FX, targeted at sportier buyers, until the 2E engine became available.

Japanese market engines:
2A-LU – 1.3 L I4, 8-valve SOHC, carb,  (AE80)
2E-LU –  I4, 12-valve SOHC, carb (EE80)
3A-LU – 1.5 L (1452 cc) I4, 8-valve SOHC, carb, transverse mount,  (AE81)
3A-U – 1.5 L (1452 cc) I4, 8-valve SOHC, carb,  (AE85, RWD)
4A-ELU – 1.6 L (1587 cc) I4, 8-valve SOHC, EFI,  (AE82)
4A-GELU – 1.6 L (1587 cc) I4, 16-valve DOHC, EFI,  (AE82)
4A-GEU – 1.6 L (1587 cc) I4, 16-valve DOHC, EFI,  (AE86, RWD)
1C-L –  I4, diesel, Mechanical Injection (CE80)

Japanese market chassis:
 AE80 – FWD, 2A-LU engine, 4-door sedan (Custom DX, DX, GL, GL Saloon, Lime, SE), 5-door liftback (SX)
 AE81 – FWD, 3A-LU engine, 4-door sedan (DX, GL, GL Saloon, Lime, SE, SE Saloon), 5-door liftback (SX, ZX), 3 hatchback (FX-D, FX-L, FX-L Lime), 5-door hatchback (FX-G, FX-L, FX-Lime, FX-SR)
AE82 – FWD, 4A-ELU/GELU engine, 4-door sedan (GT, SR), 5-door liftback (SX, ZX), 3-door hatchback (FX-GT, FX-SR), 5-door hatchback (FX-SR)
 AE85 – RWD, 3A-U engine, 2-door coupé (Levin Lime, Levin GL, Levin SE), 3-door liftback (Levin SR)
 AE86 – RWD, 4A-GEU engine, 2-door coupé (Levin GT, Levin GT-APEX), 3-door liftback (Levin GT, Levin GT-APEX, Levin GTV)
 CE80 – FWD, 1C-L engine, 4-door sedan (DX, GL, GL Saloon, SE), 5-door liftback (SX), 3/5-door hatchback (FX-G, FX-L)
 EE80 – FWD, 2E-LU engine, 4-door sedan (DX, GL, SE, SE Saloon), 5-door liftback (SX), 3/5-door hatchback (FX-D, FX-L)

North America
The American specification was available with either SOHC or DOHC engines. From 1985 to 1988, NUMMI in Fremont, California built a rebadged version of the Sprinter sedan sold by Chevrolet as the Chevrolet Nova. During calendar 1985, Corolla sedans and Sprinter-type 5-door hatchbacks (sold under both Nova and Corolla nameplates) were added, with the Toyota-branded US built cars gradually superseding imports from Japan and Nova hatchbacks being offered from the 1986 model year. Only the Corolla FX hatchback, launched in 1987 to replace the outgoing 3-door AE86 Corolla Sport liftback, was imported from Japan.

While all the rear-wheel drive 80-series Corollas were AE86 chassis in North America, the VINs differentiated between the three equipment levels: the DX got AE85, the SR-5 got AE86, and the GT-S received an AE88 VIN.

North American market engines:
1C 1.8 L I4, diesel, mechanical injection,  (1984–85)
4A-C 1.6 L I4, 8-valve SOHC, carb, 
4A-GEC 1.6 L I4, 16-valve DOHC, EFI, 

North American market chassis:
 AE82 – FWD sedan 4-door, 5-door hatchback (Std, LE, LE Ltd, SR-5, GT-S) 3-door hatchback (FX/FX16)
 AE86 – RWD coupé 2-door, 3-door liftback coupé
DX with 4A-C has "AE85" in VIN
SR-5 with 4A-C has "AE86" in VIN
GT-S with 4A-GEC has "AE88" in VIN
 CE80 – FWD sedan 4-door (rare; low sales numbers)

Europe
European market engines:
2A 1.3 L I4, 8-valve SOHC, carb, 
4A 1.6 L I4, 8-valve SOHC, carb, 
4A-LC 1.6 L I4, 8-valve SOHC, carb,  (desmogged version for Sweden and Switzerland)
4A-GE 1.6 L I4, 16-valve DOHC, EFI,  (121 PS in the hatchback)
1C 1.8 L I4, Diesel, Mechanical Injection, 
2E 1.3 L I4, 12-valve SOHC, carb, 

European market chassis:
 AE80/EE80 – FWD 4-door sedan, 5-door liftback, 3/5-door hatchback (2A, 2E engines)
 AE82 – FWD 4-door sedan, 5-door liftback, 3/5-door hatchback (4A engine)
 AE86 – RWD 2-door coupé, 3-door hatchback coupé (4A engine)
 CE80 – FWD 1.8 diesel 4-door sedan, 5-door liftback, 5-door hatchback (1C engine)

Australia
Australian market engines:
2A-LC 1.3 L I4, 8-valve SOHC, carb, AE80
4A-LC 1.6 L I4, 8-valve SOHC, carb, AE82 
4A-C 1.6 L I4, 8-valve SOHC, carb, AE86 
4A-GELC 1.6 L I4, 16-valve DOHC, EFI, 115 hp (86 kW) AE82 Twin Cam 16

Australian market chassis:
 AE80 – FWD 4-door sedan /5-door hatchback 2A-LC
 AE82 – FWD 4-door sedan /5-door hatchback /5-door Seca Liftback 4A-LC and 4A-GELC (Twin Cam 16 only)
 AE86 – RWD 3-door hatchback (badged as Toyota Sprinter) 4A-C
Australian market levels:
 'S' This was the most basic entry level version of the E80 corolla. They came with only a driver's side door mirror, Corolla emblem where the analogue clock or tachometer would be, basic AM/FM radio, 4 speed manual or 3 speed automatic. AE80 hatch and sedan, AE82 hatch and sedan.
 'CS' This was a more mid-level range with the inclusion of door pockets, 5 speed manual, an analogue clock in the combination meter, passenger-side door mirror and wheel covers. AE80 hatch and sedan, AE82 hatch, sedan and sēca lift back.
 'CS-X' this was considered high range. They had included a tachometer in the combination meter, digital VFD clock in the dashboard, alloy rims, more seat adjustments, 4 speakers, and both door mirrors being remote controlled. AE82 sedan, hatch and sēca lift back.
 'Twin Cam 16' This was the highest level. Different interior with a 3 spoke leather steering wheel and leather gear knob similar to the ones used in FX corollas and AE86s, alloy rims, fuel injected 4A-GELC engine, 5 speed manual transmission only, combination meter with tachometer, digital clock in dashboard. Hatch and sēca lift back only.

Asia
Mainly 1.3 and 1.6 petrol engines were available in Asia:

2A-C 1.3 L I4, 8-valve SOHC, carb,
2E-L 1.3 L I4, 12-valve SOHC, carb,  SAE net (Indonesia)
4A-C 1.6 L I4, 8-valve SOHC, carb

After the 1985 facelift, the 1.3 was switched to the new 12-valve E-series unit. Model designations changed at the same time; in Indonesia it was switched from GL to SE Saloon. The newer model has slightly bigger headlamps and also received flush hubcaps.

Asian market chassis:
 EE80 – FWD 4-door sedan
 AE80 – FWD 4-door sedan
 AE82 – FWD 4-door sedan

Motorsport
The rear-wheel-drive AE86 models campaigned in the Group A rally championship from 1985 until 1992. Victories included a class win in the 1985 Rally Portugal (its first), with Jorge Ortigão driving and J. Batista navigating. The car continued to be raced as late as the 1993 Acropolis Rally, with its best finish a third overall in the 1989 Rallye Côte d'Ivoire (with Adolphe Choteau/Jean-Pierre Claverie).

The AE86 became international prominent in the motorsport of drifting. Owners may heavily modify their AE86 models to where the only connection to the original model is the bodyshape.

John Smith won the 1986 Australian 2.0 Litre Touring Car Championship driving a Corolla GT AE86.

References
 

Cars introduced in 1983
Front-wheel-drive vehicles
Motor vehicles manufactured in the United States
0 80
Cars discontinued in 1990